Selmer is a masculine or feminine given name which may refer to:

 Selmer Bringsjord (born 1958), American computer scientist
 Selmer W. Gunderson (1890–1972), American politician
 Selmer Jackson (1888–1971), American actor
 Selmer M. Johnson (1916–1996), American mathematician

Masculine given names